Hugo is a static site generator written in Go. Steve Francia originally created Hugo as an open source project in 2013. Since v0.14 in 2015, Hugo has continued development under the lead of Bjørn Erik Pedersen with other contributors.  Hugo is licensed under the Apache License 2.0.

Hugo is particularly noted for its speed, and Hugo's official website states it is "the world’s fastest framework for building websites". In July 2015, Netlify began providing Hugo hosting.  Notable adopters are Smashing Magazine, which migrated from WordPress to a JAMstack solution with Hugo in and in 2017, and Cloudflare, which switched its Developer Docs from Gatsby to Hugo in 2022.

Features
Hugo takes data files, i18n bundles, configuration, templates for layouts, static files, assets, and content written in Markdown, HTML, AsciiDoctor, or Org-mode and renders a static website. Some notable features are multilingual support, image processing, asset management, custom output formats, markdown render hooks and shortcodes. Nested sections allow for different types of content to be separated, e.g. for a website containing a blog and a podcast.

Hugo can be used in combination with front-end frameworks such as Bootstrap or Tailwind. Hugo sites can be connected to cloud-based CMS software such as Netlify CMS, CloudCannon or Forestry enabling content editors to modify site content without coding knowledge.

References

External links

Blog software
Static website generators
Free static website generators
Free software programmed in Go
Software using the Apache license